Hadrotarsus is a genus of spiders in the family Theridiidae (comb-footed spiders) that was first described by Tamerlan Thorell in 1881.

Species
 it contains five species, found in Australia, Papua New Guinea, Taiwan, and Belgium:
Hadrotarsus babirussa Thorell, 1881 (type) – New Guinea
Hadrotarsus fulvus Hickman, 1943 – Australia (Tasmania)
Hadrotarsus ornatus Hickman, 1943 – Australia (Tasmania). Introduced to Belgium
Hadrotarsus setosus Hickman, 1943 – Australia (Tasmania)
Hadrotarsus yamius Wang, 1955 – Taiwan

See also
 List of Theridiidae species

References

Araneomorphae genera
Spiders of Asia
Spiders of Australia
Taxa named by Tamerlan Thorell
Theridiidae